The following highways are numbered 917:

Canada
Saskatchewan Highway 917

Costa Rica
 National Route 917

United States